Kirill Anatolyevich Nababkin (born 8 September 1986) is a Russian football player who plays for Russian Premier League side CSKA Moscow.

Career
Nabakin began his youth career with FC Moscow. In December 2009 he left the club and signed with the local rival CSKA Moscow. He joined the new club for free.

On 7 August 2020, Nababkin signed a new one-year contract with CSKA Moscow. On 19 July 2021, Nababkin signed another one-year contract with CSKA Moscow. On 20 May 2022, Nababkin extended his contract for the 2022–23 season.

International
On 25 May 2012, he was called up to the Russia national football team for the first time, being named into their UEFA Euro 2012 squad, replacing ailing Roman Shishkin. He made his national team debut on 1 June 2012 in a friendly against Italy. After a 4-year break, he was called up to the national team again in November 2018 for games against Germany and Sweden.

Career statistics

Club

International

Honours
CSKA Moscow
Russian Premier League (3): 2012–13, 2013–14, 2015–16
Russian Cup (2): 2010–11, 2012–13
Russian Super Cup (3): 2013, 2014, 2018

References

External links 
 Player profile at CSKA Moscow official website
 

1986 births
Living people
Footballers from Moscow
Russian footballers
Association football defenders
FC Moscow players
PFC CSKA Moscow players
Russian Premier League players
Russia under-21 international footballers
Russia national football B team footballers
Russia international footballers
UEFA Euro 2012 players